The 1948–49 Serie C was the eleventh edition of Serie C, the third highest league in the Italian football league system, the first one to be organized by the Lega Nazionale.

Legend

Girone A
Northwest Italy

Girone B
Northeast Italy

Girone C
Central Italy

Girone D
Southern Italy

Serie C seasons
3
Italy